The Peace Cup, was an annual club volleyball competition between Asian Men's volleyball clubs. The competition was first contested in 1989 in Japan. This competition dissolved in 1998 after the inception of the official Asian Men's Club Volleyball Championship that organised by the Asian Volleyball Confederation (AVC).

Peace Cups started in 1989 in Hiroshima under the name of the Peace Cup. These competitions were held from 1989 to 1994 in Hiroshima (6 times).  These competitions were held in 1995 and 1996 under the title of the Peace Cup in Tehran and the ninth and tenth edition held in 1997 and 1998 respectively, in Lebanon, to be the last two editions.

When the Asian Volleyball Confederation announced in 1999 to the establishment of a championship for Asian men's and women's clubs to play for the first time under his supervision, the men's clubs interested to participate in the official Asian Men's Club Volleyball Championship instead of the Peace Cup which dissolved after that.

Championships

Performances by club

Performances by country

Medals
As of 1998 Peace Cup.

References

Sources
Asian Volleyball Confederation
  Results

A
Volleyball
International volleyball competitions hosted by Iran